Come Hither is an album by saxophonist Sonny Stitt recorded in 1969 and released on the Solid State label.

Reception

Allmusic awarded the album 3 stars.

Track listing 
 "Mendocino" (Doug Sahm)
 "Gentle on My Mind" (John Hartford)
 "I'm Gonna Make You Love Me" (Kenneth Gamble, Jerry Ross)
 "Wichita Lineman" (Jimmy Webb)
 "Tasty Cakes"
 "Private Number"
 "Gimme Gimme Good Lovin'" (Joey Levine, Ritchie Cordell)
 "For Once in My Life" (Ron Miller, Orlando Murden)
 "California Soul" (Nickolas Ashford, Valerie Simpson)
 "Jo-Ann"
 "Soiree (Night Party)"

Personnel 
Sonny Stitt - varitone, tenor saxophone
Jerome Richardson - flute 
Paul Griffin - piano
Billy Butler - guitar
Bob Russell - electric bass
Joe Marshall - drums
Jimmy Mundy - arranger, conductor

References 

Sonny Stitt albums
1969 albums
Solid State Records (jazz label) albums
Albums arranged by Jimmy Mundy